Carl Barron (born 11 June 1964) is an Australian theatre and television comedian. His style is based on observational humour.

Life and career 
He was born in Longreach, Queensland, the son of a sheep shearer, and formerly worked as an apprentice roof tiler. Barron has released five DVDs, entitled Carl Barron LIVE!, Carl Barron: Whatever Comes Next, Carl Barron: Walking Down The Street, Carl Barron: A One Ended Stick and Carl Barron: Drinking With A Fork. In November 2010 a box set entitled "All The Stuff I've Done So Far" was released, which included the first three previous titles, plus a documentary and outtakes. In 1993 he was voted 'Comic of the Year' and 'Best Up and Coming Talent' and has since made many TV appearances in commercials and on TV shows such as Rove and Thank God You're Here.

Barron made his first television appearance on the NRL Footy Show on 17 April 1997.

He has regularly sold-out shows at the Melbourne International Comedy Festival. Barron has been very successful in Australia with the DVD release of Carl Barron LIVE! going four times platinum, making it the most successful Australian comedy DVD in Australian history. He has appeared in Good News Week, Out of the Question, Thank God You're Here and several episodes of Rove.

Film
Barron co-wrote and starred in the 2015 Australian film Manny Lewis, playing the title character based on himself.

Video albums

Awards and nominations

ARIA Music Awards
The ARIA Music Awards are a set of annual ceremonies presented by Australian Recording Industry Association (ARIA), which recognise excellence, innovation, and achievement across all genres of the music of Australia. They commenced in 1987.

! 
|-
| 2006 || Whatever Comes Next || rowspan="2"| ARIA Award for Best Comedy Release ||  || rowspan="2"| 
|-
| 2019 || Drinking with a Fork  ||  
|-

References

External links

Official Website

1964 births
Living people
20th-century Australian comedians
21st-century Australian comedians
People from Queensland
Australian male comedians